Valhalla is a Big Finish Productions audio drama based on the long-running British science fiction television series Doctor Who.

Plot
In Valhalla, Capital of Callisto, Jupiter's premier moon, anything and everything is for sale. But Valhalla is in trouble due to Earth granting independence and cutting off the supplies. The  Doctor visits the Job Centre and finds power cuts, barcoded citizens and monthly riots and a  termite problem.

Cast
The Doctor — Sylvester McCoy
Jevvan — Michelle Gomez
Our Mother — Susannah York
Laxton — Philip Jackson
Gerium — Fraser James
Tin-Marie — Donna Berlin
Clerk — Duncan Wisbey
Groom — Dominic Frisby
Worker — Jack Galagher

External links
Big Finish Productions – Valhalla

2007 audio plays
Seventh Doctor audio plays
Audio plays by Marc Platt